Melaleuca thyoides, commonly known as salt lake honey-myrtle is a plant in the myrtle family, Myrtaceae and is endemic to the south-west of Western Australia. It is an erect shrub with grey, papery or fibrous bark and very small, overlapping leaves on thin branchlets. It is a salt tolerant species often found on the edges of salt lakes.

Description
It has rough, dark grey bark and branchlets that are glabrous except when they first appear.

The flowers are a shade of pink to purple, sometimes white or cream, arranged in heads on the ends of branches which continue to grow after flowering and sometimes in the upper leaf axils. The stamens are arranged in five bundles around the flower, each bundle with 3 to 6 stamens.

Taxonomy and naming
Melaleuca thyoides was first formally described in 1847 by Nikolai Turczaninow in "Bulletin de la Société Impériale des Naturalistes de Moscou". The specific epithet (thyoides) is in reference to the leaves resembling those of Thuja, a genus of plant in the cypress family, Cupressaceae.

Distribution and habitat
This melaleuca occurs in and between the Ongerup, Perenjori and Cape Arid districts in the Avon Wheatbelt, Coolgardie, Esperance Plains, Geraldton Sandplains, Mallee, Swan Coastal Plain and Yalgoo biogeographic regions. It grows in clay or sandy soils near the edges of salt lakes and along river banks.

Conservation
Melaleuca thyoides is listed as "not threatened" by the Government of Western Australia Department of Parks and Wildlife.

Uses in horticulture
Melaleuca thyoides is a salt tolerant species and also moderately tolerant of water logging and drought.

References

thyoides
Myrtales of Australia
Plants described in 1847
Endemic flora of Western Australia
Taxa named by Nikolai Turczaninow